Zur is the surname of:

Giorgio Zur (1930–2019), German Roman Catholic prelate and Vatican diplomat
Inon Zur (born 1965), American music composer
Krisztina Fazekas Zur (born 1980), Hungarian sprint canoer
Rami Zur (born 1977), American retired sprint canoer, husband of Krisztina Zur

See also 
 Tzur, a common alternative transliterations of the Hebrew-language surname צוּר.